The Boxers de Bordeaux (Bordeaux Boxers) are a French ice hockey team currently playing in Ligue Magnus. The team was founded in 1974, and were promoted to the top tier of French ice hockey in 2015.

History
The team was founded in 1974 as the Bordeaux Hockey Club, and operated with the nickname Dogues de Bordeaux until 1988. The team was later known as the Girondins de Bordeaux from 1988 to 1992, as the Aquitains de Bordeaux from 1992 to 1995, and reverted to Dogues de Bordeaux from 1995 to 1998. The team has used the nickname Boxers de Bordeaux since 1998.

Patrick Francheterre served as the team's player-coach from the 1984–85 season until he retired in the 1988–89 season. He later served as the team's president from 1999 to 2001.

References

External links 
 Ligue Magnus site 
 Official Website 

Ice hockey teams in France
Sport in Bordeaux
Ice hockey clubs established in 1974
1974 establishments in France